George Watkins may refer to:
George Watkins (baseball) (1900–1970), Major League Baseball player
George Watkins (politician) (1902–1970), U.S. Representative from Pennsylvania
George Watkins (American football) (1886–1962), college football player, coach and mayor of Tulsa, Oklahoma
George C. Watkins (1815–1872), Arkansas attorney
George D. Watkins (born 1924), American solid-state physicist